Ashok Bhudania (born 14 April 1989) is an Indian cricketer. He made his List A debut for Rajasthan in the 2016–17 Vijay Hazare Trophy on 25 February 2017.

References

External links
 

1989 births
Living people
Indian cricketers
Rajasthan cricketers
Place of birth missing (living people)